Renal compensation is a mechanism by which the kidneys can regulate the plasma pH. It is slower than respiratory compensation, but has a greater ability to restore normal values. 

In respiratory acidosis, the kidney produces and excretes ammonium (NH4+) and monophosphate, generating bicarbonate in the process while clearing acid.

In respiratory alkalosis, less bicarbonate (HCO3−) is reabsorbed, thus lowering the pH.

References

Acid–base disturbances